Transformers Decepticons is an action-adventure video game based on the 2007 live action film Transformers. It is the Nintendo DS port of Transformers: The Game, but follows a different storyline and focuses exclusively on the Decepticons. It was developed by Vicarious Visions alongside Transformers Autobots, which follows the Autobots; the two games share some basic similarities, but overall feature different characters, missions and locations. Both games were published by Activision in June 2007, and received mixed reviews.

Gameplay
The game consists of four virtual locations, semi-destructible environments and enemies in the form of local law enforcement and opposing Transformers. Only cars and other robots may be destroyed. "Threat levels" denote the extent of attack the player character comes under based on how much destruction they perpetrate. Glowing spots on the map denote mission markers, which come in two varieties - twenty-three story missions, which further the game storyline, and thirty-four challenge missions, for players to test their skills. The game also features a slight RPG element in the form of XP, gained by destroying enemies and completing missions, which steadily increases players' levels (up to 20), unlocking new abilities and increasing stats. While a select number of missions allow players to take control of five of the Autobots or Decepticons featured in the movie, for the majority of the game, the player will control the "Create-A-Bot," a customizable generic Transformer whose alternate mode the player can determine by scanning any one of over thirty-seven vehicles found throughout the game locations.

The games utilizes the Nintendo Wi-Fi Connection for the "AllSpark Wars" online campaign, which pits players of the two different versions of the game against each other. Players are able to download one new special single player challenge each day and earn points upon its completion. Their score is then uploaded to a server at the end of the challenge and the side with the most points at the end of the day (Autobots or Decepticons) wins the "battle". The first side to win seven battles wins the overall "war" and a new war begins. However, if the Autobots and Decepticons win at least one piece each, a "tiebreaker match" will be played until the whole Allspark is under control of either side. Players earn Wi-Fi tokens for their involvement, which will unlock additional vehicles and cheats for use while playing the main game. Despite the aforementioned Nintendo Wi-Fi Connection support, multiplayer death-matches are limited to localized wireless play.

Synopsis

Characters
 Create-A-Bot (voiced by Steven Blum) - the player's custom-made character, who is a new Decepticon recruit and Starscream's protégé.
Megatron (voiced by Frank Welker) - the leader of the Decepticons, who was frozen in ice after tracking the AllSpark to Earth. He transforms into a Cybertronian jet.
 Barricade (voiced by Keith David) - the leader of a Decepticon team investigating the Decepticon signal that originated from Earth. He serves as a mentor figure to the Create-A-Bot and wishes to find Megatron and remove Starscream from power. He transforms into a Ford Mustang Saleen S281E police car.
 Blackout (voiced by Noah Nelson) - a polite member of Barricade's team who turns into a Sikorsky MH-53 Pave Low helicopter.
 Brawl (voiced by David Sobolov) - a destructive, yet childish member of Barricade's team who turns into a modified M1 Abrams tank. 
 Starscream (voiced by Daniel Ross) - the second-in-command of the Decepticons who seeks to find the AllSpark and become leader of the Decepticons. He transforms into a Lockheed Martin F-22 Raptor jet.

Plot
Starscream sends his protégé, the "Create-A-Bot", to Earth to help Barricade investigate a faint Decepticon signal they received. After Create-A-Bot undergoes a basic systems check, under Barricade's coordination, they encounter a group of Autobots in the area, including the Create-A-Bot from Transformers Autobots, whom he destroys. He is then called to Tranquility and tasked with helping Barricade find the Autobot Bumblebee, who has information regarding Megatron, and whom they discover has learned from a news article about a frozen "giant metal man" found in the Arctic. The Create-A-Bot then relays this information to Starscream, who encourages him to earn Barricade's trust. While Create-A-Bot distracts the local police, Barricade finds and fights Bumblebee, defeating him and retrieving the information from him. It is revealed that a human military organization called Sector 7 had Megatron imprisoned at a base in the Arctic, but moved him to an unknown location, and that a file called "Project: Ice Man" has information regarding Megatron's current location.

Blackout and Create-A-Bot next head to a SOCCENT Military Base in Qatar, where they rendezvous with Brawl, who helps Create-A-Bot attack the airfield as a distraction, while Blackout cuts off communications and hacks into the humans' network to find the "Project: Ice Man" file. The Autobot Ratchet shows up with reinforcements, but is defeated and flees Create-A-Bot the relays the information they found to Starscream, who informs him that Megatron and the AllSpark are on Earth, Megatron having followed it here years ago. Starscream encourages the Create-A-Bot not to tell anyone about the AllSpark being on Earth, claiming he wants to secure it and avoid having to fight with anyone else over it.

Back in Tranquility, Blackout discovers that Sector 7 has set up automated defenses made from Megatron's technology all over town, whom Create-A-Bot destroys, while Barricade uses the town's power plant to get enough energy to crack the file. After Brawl shields the plant's generators from Sector 7, Optimus Prime arrives on Earth with more Autobots. Create-A-Bot distracts them to give Barricade more time, culminating with him defeating Bumblebee and leaving him to be captured by Sector 7. Barricade then learns that the "ice man" described in the file is Megatron, who is being held at the Hoover Dam. The Decepticons attack the dam, with Brawl destroying several communication satellites and planting bombs as a contingency plan, while Starscream orders the Create-A-Bot to kill Megatron before Barricade can revive him. Troubled by these orders, Create-A-Bot relays them to his fellow Decepticons, who realize that Starscream wants to secure the AllSpark to ensure that no one can challenge him. Meanwhile, Barricade attacks a military base near the dam and finds a way inside after learning that Sector 7 joined forces with the Autobots. With Blackout's help, Barricade infiltrates the dam and finds that Sector 7 has kept Megatron frozen to study his technology, before unfreezing him.

With Megatron alive and leading the Decepticons once again, he vows to kill Starscream for his treachery and gives an inspiring speech to his followers, before Brawl arrives with the news that the Autobots have taken the AllSpark to Tranquility. The Decepticons attack the city, though Megatron is ambushed by Jazz, who disposed of the bombs Brawl planted earlier, and whom Megatron swiftly kills after a brief fight. In Tranquility, the Decepticons kill most of the Autobots, with Brawl taking down Ironhide, and Starscream eliminating Bumblebee. Blackout and Barricade then attempt to arrest Starscream, but he kills them both and escapes, despite Create-A-Bot's attempt to stop him. Elsewhere, Megatron battles and kills Optimus, before Starscream arrives and challenges him for leadership of the Decepticons. Alongside Create-A-Bot, Megatron pursues him to the casino strip where the former landed on Earth. Create-A-Bot attempts to kill Starscream by shoving the AllSpark into his chest, mortally wounding himself in the process, but to no avail. Megatron ultimately kills Starscream on his own, before executing the wounded Create-A-Bot, as he is no longer useful in his current state. With most of his troops dead, Megatron then transforms into a jet and flies off into the night sky, his destination unknown.

Reception

The game received "average" reviews, according to video game review aggregator Metacritic.

References

External links
 

2007 video games
Activision games
Multiplayer and single-player video games
Nintendo DS games
Nintendo DS-only games
Transformers (film series) video games
Vicarious Visions games
Video games based on adaptations
Video games based on films
Video games developed in the United States
Video games scored by Jason Graves
Video games scored by Rod Abernethy
Video games set in Qatar
Video games set in the United States